Vitalie Bordian (born 11 August 1984) is a Moldovan football defender who plays for FV Austria XIII in the Austrian fourth-tier Wiener Stadtliga.

Career
Bordian began his professional football career in the Moldovan capital Chişinău in 2001. In 2002, he was bought off to Russian Premier League club Lokomotiv Moscow. There he played for until 2004.

He signed a three-year contract with FC Metalist Kharkiv in January 2005. He signed a new contract last until 2012 in December 2008.

He played 8 games in UEFA Euro 2008 qualifying.

In December 2008, Bordian was voted the best footballer of Moldova in 2008. He got 117 points compared to second place Alexandru Epureanu from FC Moscow with 40 points.

International goal
Scores and results list Moldova's goal tally first.

References

External links

 

1984 births
Footballers from Chișinău
Living people
Moldovan footballers
Moldova international footballers
Association football defenders
FC Zimbru Chișinău players
FC Lokomotiv Moscow players
FC Metalist Kharkiv players
FC Hoverla Uzhhorod players
FC Volga Nizhny Novgorod players
FC Veris Chișinău players
FC Helios Kharkiv players
FC Dacia Chișinău players
FC Sheriff Tiraspol players
FC Dinamo-Auto Tiraspol players
Moldovan Super Liga players
Ukrainian Premier League players
Russian Premier League players
Ukrainian First League players
Austrian Landesliga players
Moldovan expatriate footballers
Expatriate footballers in Ukraine
Moldovan expatriate sportspeople in Ukraine
Expatriate footballers in Russia
Moldovan expatriate sportspeople in Russia
Expatriate footballers in Austria
Moldovan expatriate sportspeople in Austria